David Power (born 1983) is an Irish Gaelic football manager. He has been manager of the Tipperary county team since 2019.

Power previously managed Wexford. In 2020, he led Tipperary to a first Munster Senior Football Championship title for 85 years.

Career
Born in Kilsheelan, County Tipperary, Power played for the Kilsheelan–Kilcash club.

Power went on to become involved in team management and coaching. An All-Ireland-winning manager with Tipperary in the minor grade, he has also taken charge of the Tipperary under-21 and junior teams.

Power was the manager of the senior Wexford county team from 2014 until 2016.

In September 2019, Power was named as the new manager of the Tipperary senior football team on a two-year term.

On 22 November 2020, he managed Tipperary to their first Munster Senior Football Championship title for 85 years.

In the 2020 All-Ireland SFC semi-final on 6 December, Tipperary again faced Mayo. In foggy conditions and losing by 16 points at half-time they eventually lost the game by a scoreline of 5–20 to 3–13.

In September 2021, Power was given a new three-year term in charge of the Tipperary senior football team.

Honours

Manager
Tipperary
All-Ireland Minor Football Championship (1): 2011
Munster Minor Football Championship (2): 2011, 2012
Munster Senior Football Championship (1): 2020

References

1983 births
Living people
Gaelic football managers
Gaelic football selectors
Kilsheelan-Kilcash Gaelic footballers